Stenocereus pruinosus is a species of cactus. It is endemic to Mexico and occurs in the states of Veracruz, Puebla, and Oaxaca.

Description
Stenocereus pruinosus grows in the form of a tree with sparsely to richly branching stems and reaches a size of 4-5 m in height. A clear trunk is usually formed.  It has a light glaucous trunk with dark green shoots and they are 8 to 12 cm in diameter. There are six (rarely five to eight) corrugated ribs. The areoles with three to nine grayish central spines 2 to 3 cm (rarely up to 5 cm) long. The five to nine (rarely up to twelve) radial spines are also grayish in color and usually less than 15 millimeters. Funnel-shaped flowers, white, up to 9 cm long with the flowers appearing near the tips of the shoots. They open at night and are open until the next day. The elongated green fruit, tinged with red, 5 to 8 cm long and can reach a diameter of 5 cm. The flesh is red.

Uses 
Because of its edible fruit, this species is a valuable food source in its native range, Mexico, being harvested and sold in many rural markets.

References

pruinosus
Endemic flora of Mexico